U-237 may refer to:

, a German Type VIIC submarine used in World War II
 Uranium-237 (U-237 or 237U), an isotope of uranium